William A. Lawrence (26 March 1822 - 12 August 1890) was a member of the Wisconsin State Assembly and the Wisconsin State Senate. He was elected to the Assembly in 1851. In 1862 and 1864, he was elected to the Senate from the 17th District. Other positions Lawrence held include Mayor of Janesville, Wisconsin and County Treasurer of Rock County, Wisconsin. He was a Republican.

References

1822 births
1890 deaths
Politicians from Janesville, Wisconsin
Republican Party Wisconsin state senators
Republican Party members of the Wisconsin State Assembly
Mayors of places in Wisconsin
County treasurers in Wisconsin
19th-century American politicians